Zahirabad Lok Sabha constituency is one of the 17 Lok Sabha (Lower House of the Parliament) constituencies in Telangana state in southern India.

B. B. Patil of Telangana Rashtra Samithi is currently representing the constituency for the first time.

History
The constituency came into existence in 2008, following the implementation of delimitation of parliamentary constituencies based on the recommendations of the Delimitation Commission of India constituted in 2002. It comprises three constituencies from Medak district and four assembly constituencies from Kamareddy district.

Assembly segments
Zahirabad Lok Sabha constituency comprises the following Legislative Assembly segments:

Members of Parliament

Election results

General Election, 2019

General Election, 2014

General Election, 2009

See also
 List of Constituencies of the Lok Sabha
 Medak district

References

External links
 Zahirabad lok sabha  constituency election 2019 date and schedule

Lok Sabha constituencies in Telangana
Medak district